The Municipal Chamber of Belo Horizonte is the legislative body of the government of Belo Horizonte, the capital of the state of Minas Gerais in Brazil.

It is unicameral and is composed of 41 councilors.

History
The city of Belo Horizonte was founded on December 12, 1897. After its creation, the municipality was indirectly governed by the state governor (then president of the state) who personally chose who would be the mayor.

The first legislative body was the Deliberative Council of Belo Horizonte, with its activities started in 1900, which despite its members being chosen directly by popular vote, only discussed and voted on the municipal budget and taxes proposed by the mayor. Initially, the activities of the Deliberative Council were held in a room in the Chamber of Deputies. In 1914, the building on the corner of Rua da Bahia and Avenida Augusto de Lima, now the Fashion Museum, was inaugurated to house the Deliberative Council and the Municipal Public Library.

In 1930, after the 1930 Revolution, the Deliberative Council was closed. With the 1934 Constitution, the opening of legislative houses was once again allowed, which would only be opened in 1936 in Belo Horizonte, with more powers to deal with local affairs. With the installation of the Estado Novo in 1937, the legislative bodies were once again closed through the new Constitution of 1937.

The 1946 constitution determined the reopening of municipal legislative bodies and in 1947 the Municipal Chamber of Belo Horizonte began operating. During the military regime, the chamber had its functions reduced, but not extinguished. It remained at its headquarters on Rua da Bahia until 1977, when it was transferred to the then-Francisco Bicalho Palace, on Rua dos Tamoios. In 1988, it was relocated to the current headquarters, which are at 3100 Avenida dos Andradas.

Structure
The chamber is made up of 41 councilors, divided between the Board of Directors, the General Directorate, the Institutional Communication Superintendence, the Human Resources Directorate, the Administration and Finance Directorate, and the Legislative Directorate.

Members (2021-2024) 

 UNIÃO Álvaro Damião
 UNIÃO Léo

 PSOL Bella Gonçalves
 PSOL Iza Lourença

 AVANTE Bim da Ambulância
 AVANTE Juninho Los Hermanos
 AVANTE Professor Claudiney Dulim

 NOVO Braulio Lara
 NOVO Fernanda Pereira Altoé
 NOVO Marcela Trópia

 PDT Bruno Miranda
 PDT Duda Salabert
 PDT Miltinho CGE

 PTB Ciro Pereira

 PSD Cláudio do Mundo Novo
 PSD Helinho da Farmácia
 PSD Fernando Luiz
 PSD Ramon Bibiano da Casa de Apoio

 PSC Dr. Célio Frois

 PP Marcos Crispim

 PP Flávia Borja

 PP José Ferreira

 PP Professora Marli

 PP Wesley

 PP Wilsinho da Tabu

 PP Rogerio Alkimim

 PP Rubão

 PL Nikolas Ferreira

 PL Walter Tosta

 REPUBLICANOS Jorge Santos
 PATRI Irlan Melo
 PATRI Wanderley Porto
 CIDADANIA Marilda Portela
 PSDB Henrique Braga
 PODE Nely Aquino

 PT Pedro Patrus
 PT Macaé Evaristo
 AGIR Professor Juliano Lopes
 REDE Gilson Guimarães
 MDB Reinaldo Gomes Preto Sacolão

 Without party Gabriel

References

Unicameral legislatures
Municipal chambers in Brazil
Belo Horizonte